The 1921–22 Loyola Ramblers men's basketball team represents Loyola University Chicago during the 1921–22 college men's basketball season. The ramblers were led by first-year head coach Harry Rhodes. The team had finished the season with a winless record of 0–6.

Schedule

|-

References

Loyola Ramblers men's basketball seasons
Loyola Ramblers
Loyola Ramblers
Loyola Ramblers